This is a list of dinosaurs whose remains have been recovered from South America.

Criteria for inclusion
The genus must appear on the List of dinosaur genera.
At least one named species of the creature must have been found in South America.
This list is a complement to :Category:Dinosaurs of South America.

List of South American dinosaurs

Valid genera

Invalid and potentially valid genera 

 Angaturama limai: Only known from the tip of the snout. It may belong to the contemporary Irritator, but it could also represent its own taxon.
 "Bayosaurus pubica": An abelisaurid known from partial postcranial remains.
 Oxalaia quilombensis: Potentially a junior synonym of Spinosaurus.
 "Ubirajara jubatus": Known from a single specimen that preserves impressions of feathers, including display feathers on its sides. Its description was retracted before it could be published due to allegations that the specimen was illegally exported from Brazil.

Timeline
This is a timeline of selected dinosaurs from the list above.  Time is measured in Ma, megaannum, along the x-axis. Carnivores are shown in red, herbivores in green and omnivores in blue.

See also

 List of birds of South America

References 

South America
†Dinosaurs